Frequent confession is the spiritual practice among many Christians, especially Catholics, Lutherans and Anglicans, of going to the sacrament of reconciliation often and regularly in order to grow in holiness. 

It is a practice that has been recommended by Catholic leaders and saints as a powerful means of growing in love with God, in humility, and having sorrow for sins, since it is considered a personal encounter with Jesus who is the source of God's grace, help, and forgiveness.

A recommended frequency, based on the teachings of past popes and canon law, is between once a month and once a week.

This practice "was introduced into the Church by the inspiration of the Holy Spirit", according to Pius XII. Confession of everyday faults is "strongly recommended by the Church",  according to the Catechism of the Catholic Church 1458. Paul VI said that frequent Confession is "of great value". According to the study of Sal Ferigle of Church law and teachings, "whenever possible, frequent Confession will ordinarily mean between once a month and once a week."

Many Lutheran Churches and Anglican Churches also encourage going to frequent Holy Absolution, and follow similar teachings as Roman Catholics on frequent Confession.

Basis and importance

The Catholic Church teaches that everyone is called to sanctity, since man was created to love and serve God, the ultimate source of man's happiness.  For this, God has given the sacraments as God's way of giving divine life to each person. 

The Catechism of the Catholic Church teaches:

Without being strictly necessary, confession of everyday faults (venial sins) is nevertheless strongly recommended by the Church. Indeed the regular Confession of our venial sins helps us form our conscience, fight against evil tendencies, let ourselves be healed by Christ and progress in the life of the Spirit. By receiving more frequently through this sacrament the gift of the Father's mercy, we are spurred to be merciful as he is merciful. (CCC 1458)
 
Paul VI who presided over the Second Vatican Council taught that frequent Confession is "of great value". 

“Frequent and reverent recourse to this sacrament, even when only venial sin is in question, is of great value. Frequent Confession is not mere ritual repetition, nor is it merely a psychological exercise. Rather it is a constant effort to bring to perfection the grace of our Baptism, so that we carry about in our bodies the death of Jesus Christ who died; so that the life Jesus Christ lives may be more and more manifested in us. In such Confessions, while indeed confessing venial sins, penitents should be mainly concerned with becoming more conformed to Christ and more submissive to the voice of the Spirit.”

John Paul II who went to Confession weekly, said:

"It would be an illusion to seek after holiness, according to the vocation one has received from God, without partaking frequently of this sacrament of conversion and reconciliation.  Those who go to Confession frequently, and do so with the desire to make progress, will notice the strides that they make in their spiritual lives."

In his Apostolic Exhortation, Reconcilatio et Paenitentia, John Paul II also encouraged frequent Confession even if only of venial sins: 
"We shall also do well to recall that, for a balanced spiritual and pastoral orientation in this regard, great importance must continue to be given to teaching the faithful also to make use of the sacrament of penance for venial sins alone, as is borne out by a centuries-old doctrinal tradition and practice.

"Though the church knows and teaches that venial sins are forgiven in other ways too - for instance, by acts of sorrow, works of charity, prayer, penitential rites - she does not cease to remind everyone of the special usefulness of the sacramental moment for these sins too. The frequent use of the sacrament - to which some categories of the faithful are in fact held - strengthens the awareness that even minor sins offend God and harm the church, the body of Christ. Its celebration then becomes for the faithful 'the occasion and the incentive to conform themselves more closely to Christ and to make themselves more docile to the voice of the Spirit.' Above all it should be emphasized that the grace proper to the sacramental celebration has a great remedial power and helps to remove the very roots of sin."(32; citing Ordo Paenitentiae, 17)

Advantages of frequent Confession
The advantages of frequent Confession was discussed by Pius XII. He said that "the pious practice of frequent Confession which was introduced into the Church by the inspiration of the Holy Spirit [is] to be earnestly advocated."

Pius XII, who went to Confession daily, explained that by frequent Confession: 
genuine self-knowledge is increased, 
Christian humility grows, 
bad habits are corrected, 
spiritual neglect and tepidity are resisted, 
the conscience is purified, 
the will strengthened, 
a salutary self-control is attained, 
grace is increased in virtue of the sacrament itself. 

He then warned those "who make light of or lessen esteem for frequent Confession know what they are doing. What they are doing is alien to the spirit of Christ and disastrous for the Mystical Body of Christ."

Benedict Baur's book, Frequent Confession is a classic in explaining the advantages of frequent Confession:

In frequent Confession we have everything that will guard us against tepidity. For one thing, frequent Confession compels us to look into ourselves seriously to see our sins and faults, to elicit an act of contrition for them and formulate a purpose of amendment regarding them. In other words, it makes us apply ourselves with full deliberation and determination to improving our lives. 

Then, too, Confession is a sacrament and consequently, through it the power of Christ himself works in us. His greatest desire in this sacrament is to fill us with his own hatred of sin and with his own zeal to glorify his Father in all things, to be completely devoted to his service and fully resigned to his holy will. 

Finally, of considerable value is the direction we get from our confessor, who in every Confession will urge us anew and encourage us to continue along the way of virtue with full fervor.

It is this conviction that makes the Church recommend so strongly, indeed prescribe as an obligation, frequent or weekly Confession for clerics and religious. Therefore let us consider frequent Confession as something important and holy. And let us endeavor always to make our Confessions well indeed to try and make them better and better every time. 

John Paul II also enumerated these:
we are renewed in fervor, 
strengthened in our resolutions, and
supported by divine encouragement

He said those who discourage frequent Confession "are lying."

Recommended frequency

According to Rev. Fr. Sal Ferigle, "For those who sincerely wish to do their best to avail themselves of the opportunity of frequent Confession in order to grow spiritually, frequent Confession will ordinarily be linked to having a fixed confessor. The confessor will be the best qualified person to suggest the frequency suited to the spiritual development and the physical and moral possibilities of the penitent. 

Within those rather broad limits of flexibility and to seek a general rule of common sense, we can refer to [Paul VI's General Audiences] which speaks about 'receiving the Sacrament of Penance frequently, that is twice a month.' Previous legislation which specified regular intervals for Confession spoke about weekly Confession. One can therefore say in general terms that, whenever possible, frequent Confession will ordinarily mean between once a month and once a week."

See also

Morning Offering
Thanksgiving after Communion
Rosary
Spiritual reading
Angelus
Memorare 
Visit to the Blessed Sacrament
Examination of conscience

References

Further reading
Frequent Confession by Rev. S.M. Ferigle

Catholic spirituality